The Local Elections and Register of Electors (Temporary Provisions) Act 1939 (2 & 3 Geo.6 c. 115) was a war time Act of the Parliament of the United Kingdom that postponed local elections and the preparation of registers of electors. Initially the postponement was for one year, but the Act was renewed annually until the electoral cycle was resumed in 1945 following the cessation of hostilities.

Provisions

The Act had ten sections.

Section 1 provided that:
 
"While this Act is in force, no local election shall be held and any alderman, councillor or elective auditor in office at the commencement of this Act shall continue in office".

Where casual vacancies occurred, these were to be filled by the councils concerned who were given the power to appoint (or co-opt) any qualified person they wished.

Section 2 provided that the registers of electors and jurors books in force in 1938 should remain valid
Section 3 relieved the local authorities of the duty of compiling new registers and other duties concerned with local elections.
Section 4 extended the postponement to the Common Council of the City of London.
Section 5 dealt with newly incorporated municipal boroughs, which were due to have the first election of councillors on 1 November 1939. The section provided that the councillors of the predecessor urban or rural district would become borough councillors without the need for a fresh election. Where the number of councillors for the new borough exceeded those of the district council, the district councillors were given the power to appoint additional members. The new council was also to proceed with the election of aldermen as provided by their charter.
Section 6 prevented changes to the areas or status of local authorities. Specifically it stated that no order could come into force that:
Altered or defined the boundaries of any county, borough, urban or rural district or parish
Divided any borough or urban district or parish into wards, or alter the boundaries of any ward in a borough or urban district or parish
Grouped any parishes or dissolved any group of parishes or established a separate parish council for any parish
Altered the boundaries of the electoral divisions of any county
Altered the number of councillors of any county council, borough council, urban or rural district council or parish council or dissolved any parish council
Formed a new urban or rural district or parish
Divided any county or urban or rural district or parish
United any county with any other county or with any county borough, or united any county borough with a county, or united any borough with any other borough, or united any urban or rural district with any other such district, whether urban or rural, or united any parish with another parish
Included in a borough an urban or rural district,
Transferred a part of a non-county borough to an urban or rural district, or transferred the whole or part of an urban or rural district to a non-county borough,
Transferred any part of an urban or rural district to another such district, whether urban or rural, or transferred any part of a parish to another parish
Converted any rural district or any part of a rural district into an urban district or any urban district or any part of an urban district into a rural district
Section 7 dealt with the definitions of the various terms in the Act
Section 8 applied the Act to Scotland, substituting the terms "burgh" and "district" where appropriate.
Section 9 applied the Act to Northern Ireland. Elections were not cancelled, but the Government of Northern Ireland was relieved of the responsibility of compiling a new register of electors.
Section 10 gave the short title of the Act, and provided that it would expire on 31 December 1940, with councillors and aldermen entitled to remain in office for six months after that date, or to such date as parliament decided.

Renewal
With the continuation of the war until 1945, the provisions of the 1939 legislation had to be renewed on five further occasions by the Local Elections and Register of Electors (Temporary Provisions) Acts of 1940, 1941, 1942, 1943, and 1944.

References

Local government in the United Kingdom
United Kingdom Acts of Parliament 1939
Local government legislation in England and Wales
Election law in the United Kingdom
United Kingdom home front during World War II
Election legislation